This is a list of fleets of the Imperial Japanese Navy, the navy of the Empire of Japan. This navy existed from 1868 to 1945, when it was replaced by the Japan Maritime Self-Defense Force.

High rank fleets
These fleets were under the command of the Ministry of the Navy, Imperial General Headquarters or Imperial Japanese Navy General Staff.

 9 March 1869 => 27 July 1870

 28 July 1870 => 17 May 1872

 18 May 1872 => 25 October 1875, divided into Eastern Fleet and Western Fleet on 28 October 1875.
 5 September 1876 => 28 December 1885, reorganized to Standing Small-Fleet.

 28 October 1875 => 4 September 1876, incorporated into Medium Fleet on 5 September 1876.

 28 October 1875 => 4 September 1876, incorporated into Medium Fleet on 5 September 1876.

 18 July 1894 => 15 November 1895
 28 December 1903 => 20 December 1905
 1 December 1922 => 10 October 1945

 20 October 1937 => 9 September 1945

 15 November 1943 => 10 October 1945

Medium rank fleets
These fleets were under the command of a higher rank fleet, and themselves commanded one or more lower rank fleets.

 10 April 1942 => 3 September 1945

 20 December 1942 => 6 September 1945

 5 August 1943 => 5 December 1944

 1 March 1944 => 15 November 1944

 4 May 1944 => 18 July 1944

 5 February 1945 => 12 September 1945

Lower rank fleets
These did not in general have any other fleets under their command.

 28 December 1885 => 29 July 1889, reorganized to Standing Fleet.

 29 July 1889 => 28 December 1903, reorganized to 1st Fleet and 2nd Fleet.

 13 July 1894 => 19 July 1894, reorganized to Western Sea Fleet.

 19 July 1894 => 15 November 1895

 28 December 1903 => 25 February 1944

 28 December 1903 => 20 April 1945

 28 December 1903 => 20 December 1905
 24 December 1908 => 24 December 1915, reorganized from Southern China Expeditionary Fleet.
 25 December 1915 => 1 December 1922
 2 February 1932 => 14 November 1939, reorganized to 1st China Expeditionary Fleet on 15 November 1939.
 10 April 1941 => 9 March 1942, renamed to 2nd Southern Expeditionary Fleet on 10 March 1942.
 14 July 1942 => 15 December 1944, reorganized from 1st Air Fleet.

 14 June 1905 => 20 December 1905
 20 October 1937 => 15 November 1939, reorganized to 3rd China Expeditionary Fleet on 15 November 1939.
 15 November 1939 => 15 September 1945

 1 February 1938 => 14 November 1939, reorganized to 2nd China Expeditionary Fleet on 15 November 1939.
 25 July 1941 => 5 February 1945

 15 November 1940 => 15 September 1945

 15 April 1945 => 15 September 1945

 14 July 1942 => 8 September 1945

 15 November 1943 => 10 July 1944

 10 April 1941 => 14 July 1942, carrier task force.
 1 July 1943 => 15 June 1945, reconstituted as the land-based air fleet.

 15 June 1944 => 8 January 1945, land-based air fleet.

 10 July 1944 => 15 October 1945, land-based air fleet.

 10 February 1945 => 10 October 1945, land-based air fleet.

 1 March 1945 => 10 October 1945, land-based air fleet.

 15 January 1941 => 6 September 1945, land-based air fleet.

 18 May 1943 => 30 November 1945, land-based air fleet.

 20 September 1943 => 12 September 1945, land-based air fleet.

 4 March 1944 => 18 July 1944, land-based air fleet.

 20 December 1905 => 23 December 1908, reorganized to 3rd Fleet on 24 December 1908.

 10 August 1918 => 8 August 1919, reorganized from 7th Division on 10 August 1918, reorganized to 1st Expeditionary Fleet on 9 August 1919.

 9 August 1919 => 19 May 1933, reorganized from China Expeditionary Fleet on 9 August 1919, reorganized to 11th Division on 20 May 1933.

 7 February 1917 => 30 November 1918, renamed from 1st Special Task Fleet on 1 December 1918.
 16 May 1927 => 20 April 1933

 15 November 1939 => 19 August 1943, renamed from 3rd Fleet on 15 November 1939, reorganized Yangtze River Area Base Force on 20 August 1943.

 15 November 1939 => 9 September 1945, renamed from 5th Fleet on 15 November 1939.

 15 November 1939 => 9 April 1942, renamed from 4th Fleet on 15 November 1939, reorganized Qingdao Area Special Base Force on 10 April 1942.

 31 July 1941 => 2 January 1942, renamed 1st Southern Expeditionary Fleet on 3 January 1942.

 3 January 1942 => 12 September 1945, renamed from Southern Expeditionary Fleet.

 10 March 1942 => 3 September 1945, renamed from 3rd Fleet.

 3 January 1942 => 3 September 1945

 30 November 1943 => 10 March 1945

 10 December 1944 => 25 August 1945, reorganized from 1st Escort Squadron.

Temporary fleets

 31 January 1905 => 4 November 1905, Converted merchant cruisers fleet in the Russo-Japanese War.

 20 December 1905 => 20 September 1940, organized and dissolved every year.

 6 October 1908 => 25 October 1908, organized for serving the Great White Fleet.

 1 April 1911 => 12 November 1911, organized for the Coronation Fleet Review of George V.

 7 February 1917 => 30 November 1919, fleet for unrestricted submarine warfare in World War I, renamed 2nd Expeditionary Fleet on 1 December 1919.

 7 February 1917 => 20 July 1919, fleet for unrestricted submarine warfare in  World War I.

 13 April 1917 => 12 December 1917, fleet for unrestricted submarine warfare in World War I, renamed from 4th Division on 13 April 1917.

Battle order of Imperial Japanese Navy fleets
These diagrams cover only fleets, omitting naval districts, guard districts, divisions, flotillas, squadrons, detachments, and other elements.
9 March 1869 (Boshin War)

28 July 1870

18 May 1872

28 October 1875

28 January 1877 (Satsuma Rebellion)

28 December 1885

29 July 1889

29 July 1894 (First Sino-Japanese War)

6 February 1905 (Battle of Tsushima, Russo-Japanese War)

13 April 1917 (World War I)

10 October 1937 (Second Sino-Japanese War)

10 December 1941 (Pacific War)

1 April 1944 (before the Battle of the Philippine Sea)

29 May 1945 (after the Operation Ten-Go)

Bibliography
Naval Minister's Secretariat/Ministry of the Navy (stored at Japan Center for Asian Historical Records (JACAR), National Archives of Japan)
Monograph: Year of 1900 - Extract of naval war history of Qing Incident, each volume.
Fleet boat division organization and warship torpedo boat deployment, each volume.
Vessels boat service list, each volume.
 Senshi Sōsho each volume, Asagumo Simbun, Tōkyō, Japan.

Rekishi Dokuhon, Special issue No. 33 Overview of admirals of the Imperial Japanese Navy, Shin-Jinbutsuōraisha, Tōkyō, Japan, 1999.
The Japanese Modern Historical Manuscripts Association, Organizations, structures and personnel affairs of the Imperial Japanese Army & Navy, University of Tōkyō Press, Tōkyō, Japan, 1971, .
The Maru Special series each volume, Tōkyō, Japan.
Ships of the World series each volume, Tōkyō, Japan.
Seiki Sakamoto and Hideki Fukukawa (joint authorship), Encyclopedia of organizations of the Imperial Japanese Navy, Fuyōs Sobō Shuppan, Tōkyō, Japan, 2003, .

Imperial Japanese Navy
Fleets of the Imperial Japanese Navy